Nzhelele Dam (also known as Njelele Dam) is an arch type dam located on the Nzhelele River in Limpopo Province, South Africa. It has a capacity of 55.3 million m3. It was established in 1948. The main purpose of the dam is to serve for irrigation and its hazard potentials has been ranked high (3).

See also
List of reservoirs and dams in South Africa

References 

Dams in South Africa
Dams completed in 1948